Leinfelden-Echterdingen (Swabian: Laefälda-Ächdordeng) is a town in the district of Esslingen, in Baden-Württemberg, Germany. It is located approximately 10 km south of Stuttgart, near the Stuttgart Airport and directly adjacent to the newly built Stuttgart Trade Fair. The town was formed on 1 January 1975 by the merging of four former municipalities: Leinfelden, Echterdingen, Musberg and Stetten auf den Fildern. Zeppelin LZ 4 caught fire and burned out in Echterdingen in August 1908.

Twin towns – sister cities

Leinfelden-Echterdingen is twinned with:
 Manosque, France (1973)
 Poltava, Ukraine (1988)
 York, United States (1989)
 Voghera, Italy (2000)

Economy 
Daimler Truck is headquartered in the town.

References

External links

Esslingen (district)